Qadeeruddin Ahmed (1909 – 23 March 1995) was a Pakistani jurist, constitutional expert, former Chief Justice of West Pakistan High Court, former Chief Justice of Sindh High Court, former Judge of the Supreme Court of Pakistan and former Governor of Sindh province.

Life
He was born in 1909 in Delhi, India and died on 23 March 1995.
1995 · He left behind a widow, two sons and five daughters.

Justice Qadeeruddin remained the Chief Justice of the West Pakistan High Court until the end of the one unit. Subsequently, he became the Chief Justice of Sindh High Court and remained in that position until his retirement in 1971. He also served as a judge of the Supreme Court of Pakistan for some time.

A number of famous cases were decided during his tenure as the Chief Justice of West Pakistan and Sindh High Courts.

Justice Qadeeruddin acquired his college education from St. Stephen’s College, Delhi.

Justice Qadeeruddin also spent a few years in Hyderabad Deccan prior to the creation of Pakistan. A number of his family members were settled in Hyderabad State although the family came from UP.

He served as the Governor of Sindh in 1988/89.

He also wrote many papers and books on important national issues. One of the key issues on which he wrote was the concept of "riba" (usury) according to the Qur'anic dictates. His views on the subject were disputed by a number of scholars.

Publications
Ahmed's publications include:
What is Riba? article published in Journal of Islamic Banking and Finance (1995)  Vol. 12, No. 1, pp. 7–49.
The Demand of a Muslim Homeland, Dawn newspaper, 23.3.1992
Islam in Our Lives book published by Royal Book Company, Karachi, 1989, 198pp.

See also
List of Pakistanis
Sindh High Court
West Pakistan High Court

Footnotes

Governors of Sindh
Pakistani judges
Pakistani people of Hyderabadi descent
People from Hyderabad State
1909 births
1995 deaths
People from British India